Michael Carver Trout (September 30, 1810 – June 25, 1873) was a Democratic member of the U.S. House of Representatives from Pennsylvania.

Biography
Michael C. Trout was born in Hickory Township, Pennsylvania. He received a very limited education, and was employed as a hatter for three years and then became a carpenter and contractor. He served as president of the Hickory Township School Board for twenty years. He was elected burgess of Sharon in 1841, recorder of Mercer County, Pennsylvania, from 1842 to 1845, and prothonotary from 1846 to 1851.

Trout was elected as a Democrat to the Thirty-third Congress. He was an unsuccessful candidate for reelection and engaged in iron manufacturing, banking, and coal mining.

He died in Hickory Township in 1873. Interment in Morefield Cemetery in Hickory Township, near Sharon, Pennsylvania.

Sources 
 
 The Political Graveyard

Pennsylvania prothonotaries
People from Mercer County, Pennsylvania
American milliners
American carpenters
1810 births
Democratic Party members of the United States House of Representatives from Pennsylvania
1873 deaths
19th-century American politicians
School board members in Pennsylvania